Elachista intrigella is a moth of the family Elachistidae. It is found in Austria.

References

intrigella
Moths described in 1992
Moths of Europe